Elaine Antoinette Parent (August 4, 1942 – April 6, 2002) was an American criminal known as "the world's most wanted woman" in the late 1990s and early 2000s.

She was wanted for the murder of her potential roommate, Beverly McGowan, a 34-year-old bank clerk. McGowan had placed an ad in the paper looking for a roommate. A woman named "Alice" answered the ad. The woman was actually Parent. Soon after, McGowan disappeared; on July 19, 1990, her remains were found in a rural canal in St. Lucie County, Florida. She had been mutilated by removing a tattoo on her stomach, her head had been decapitated and her hands severed to hinder the identification, however the killer had overlooked another small tattoo, which this, along with a couple teeth that were left from the decapitation, were enough to positively identify her.

According to investigators, Parent was known to have traveled around the world on more than 20 different identities and was a master of disguise, even at times posing as a man.

The origin of Parent's nickname, the "Chameleon Killer," was a photograph of an oil painting of herself she sent to police with the message "Best wishes: your Chameleon" typed on the back. The nickname was apt, as she stole the identities of her victims and was found to have used McGowan's credit cards after she killed her. She also scoured graveyards for names and dates of birth and stole the information of other potential roommates by telling them she was a numerologist, soliciting their Social Security numbers, driver's licences and even birth certificates.

When Florida police caught up with her in Panama City, Florida, on April 6, 2002, she committed suicide by shooting herself in the heart as they stood outside her bedroom door waiting for her to get dressed.

There have been concerns that in her time on the run she is likely to have committed other crimes. Some investigators have even questioned if "Elaine Parent" was her actual, given name, since no birth certificate for her has ever been found.

Beverly McGowan's murder and the search for Elaine Parent were profiled on Unsolved Mysteries and America's Most Wanted. In 2003, BBC did a special documentary on Parent's criminal career titled "The World's Most Wanted Woman". In 2014, she was featured on the Investigation Discovery program Swamp Murders.

References 

1942 births
2002 suicides
Suicides by firearm in Florida
American female murderers
American murderers
American female criminals